Epibacterium scottomollicae is a bacterium from the genus of Epibacterium which has been isolated from marine biofilm from Genoa in Italy.

References 

Rhodobacteraceae
Bacteria described in 2008